Cassie Layne Winslow is a fictional character from Guiding Light, an American soap opera on the CBS network. She was first portrayed by Laura Wright for an eight-year period, followed by Nicole Forester until the character's departure in 2008. Laura Stepp temporarily played the character in 2001.

Casting and creation 
The role of Cassie was originated by actress Laura Wright, who was known for her role as Ally Rescott on the ABC Daytime soap opera's Loving and The City. The actress premiered in the role on August 1, 1997. Actress Laura Stepp briefly stepped into the role for three episodes between January 8–10, 2001, while Wright was on maternity leave.

In September 2005, it was announced that Wright had decided not to renew her contract with the soap, calling it something she needed to do. She wrote on her official website (now defunct):

Days later, it was announced that Wright would join the ABC soap General Hospital as the fourth actress to portray character, Carly Corinthos. Guiding Light announced their decision to recast Cassie, following Wright's exit in the role.

On September 29, 2005, it was announced the newcomer Nicole Forester would replace Wright in her role as Cassie. It was said that soap actresses Cynthia Preston (ex-Faith Rosco, General Hospital) and Jensen Buchanan (ex-Marley/Vicky, Another World) were also considered for the recast of Cassie, with Forester beating both actresses out for the role. Forester previous has guest-starring roles on such series like Monk and Two and a Half Men.

Wright's last airdate as Cassie was November 3, 2005, with Forester premiering in the role the following day on November 4. In September 2008, it was announced Forester had opted to vacate the role of Cassie in favor of starting a family with her then soon-to-be husband. Forester released a statement, saying:

Forester's last date as Cassie aired on November 4, 2008, exactly three years after stepping into the role.

Storylines
Cassie was originally named Danni Shayne. The character of Cassie was originated by actress Laura Wright in the summer of 1997, barring a two-day leave in January 2001 (in which Laura Stepp filled in), and until her final appearance in November 2005. Soon afterward, Nicole Forester took over the role of Cassie in November 2005, continuing to play her through November 2008. Cassie has two children, a daughter named Tammy and a son named R.J.

Cassie's entrance onto the canvas was part of a "retcon" storyline where the audience learned that Reva Shayne's mother Sarah had a child out of wedlock. After Sarah's death, Reva searched for her sister and briefly believed it was her archenemy Annie Dutton. She eventually learned it was Cassie, and the two sisters developed a relationship after Cassie moved to Springfield.

Cassie gave birth to a stillborn child before adopting Will with Richard. She would then discover that she was still fertile when Edmund and herself suffered a surprise miscarriage in 2004. In early 2005, Cassie and Edmund decided to try to conceive via IVF but when she found out about Edmund's involvement in the Jessup barn fire that would have taken R.J.'s life had he not been rescued (by Dinah Marler, ironically), she separated from Edmund and found solace in her friendship with Jeffrey O'Neill. Desperate for a child with Cassie, Edmund took up on Dinah's offer to be a surrogate mother for Edmund. When Cassie found out about Edmund's deception, she kicked him out of the house and took in her archrival instead. She would later break up with Edmund officially when she saw him holding a shovel over Dinah's head when the latter faked an abduction (with help from Jonathan Randall).

In June 2005, Dinah revealed to Jonathan that she'd miscarried Edmund and Cassie's child weeks ago when he found an apparatus in her room that she had been using to simulate pregnancy. Cassie had no idea that Dinah was no longer with child, though the latter had revealed this to Edmund, who convinced her to continue the charade. In a stunning plot twist, Edmund hatched a plan to dupe both Cassie and Michelle Bauer by stealing Michelle Bauer's baby, passing it off to Cassie as their baby, and telling Cassie that Dinah, whom he had locked up, had run off after giving birth.
After the death of her daughter Tammy in 2007 and her marriage and then divorce from ex-brother-in-law Josh  Lewis resulting from her  brief and disastrous affair with Cyrus Foley and her adopted troubled son Will being sent away to reform school, Cassie moved to Hawaii with her son RJ to start a new life near the end of 2008.

Marriages
Cassie has been married 5 different times. Her first husband was Rob Layne whom Cassie divorced a year after her arrival in Springfield, in 1998. After the murder of her fiancé Hart Jessup, Cassie married Prince Richard Winslow in 2000 on a strictly business arrangement. It would be agreed that Cassie would give the San Cristoballian Republic a legitimate heir to the throne in exchange for Prince Richard aiding her in her financial troubles. However, after it was discovered that Rob Layne hadn't signed divorce papers, her marriage to Prince Richard was ruled invalid. After Cassie successfully divorced Rob, she remarried Prince Richard whom she remained with until his death 2 years later. Cassie later married Prince Richard's brother Ambassador Edmund Winslow from December 2004 to November 2005 and to her former brother-in-law, Joshua Lewis. Cassie is currently living in Hawaii with her son R.J. living off her own income from the salvage of the Beacon Hotel.

References

Citations

Notes

Winslow, Layne Cassie
Winslow, Layne Cassie
Television characters introduced in 1997
Fictional erotic dancers